"Weak and Powerless" is the first single by the alternative rock band A Perfect Circle, from their second album, Thirteenth Step, and is also their highest charting single, reaching #1 on both the Mainstream Rock Tracks and Alternative Songs, the band's first number-one hit. This song was featured in the movie Underworld.

Remixes
One of the most prominent aspects of "Weak and Powerless" is its various layers of clean guitars and vocals, which build the relatively soft yet highly active verse into a powerful chorus. A remix of the song was made, entitled "Weak and Powerless (Tilling My Grave Mix)" and featuring instrumentation by Danny Lohner, Wes Borland, and Josh Eustis. This version is significantly heavier than the album version and was featured in the soundtrack to Underworld. Borland told Cleveland Radio station 100.7 The Buzzard in an interview at the time of the soundtrack's promotion that he and Lohner wrote the remix by putting the song up in Pro Tools and stripping away everything but Maynard's vocals, leaving the three of them to write new music around the vocals.

Official versions
 "Weak And Powerless" - 3:15
 "Weak And Powerless" (Tilling My Grave Mix) - 3:04

Music video
The music video, directed by the Brothers Strause, features a nude woman with long, white hair, as seen in various artwork for the album, crawling through the woods, collecting various reptiles, and throwing them into an amblypygi -filled pit. The commentary by Maynard James Keenan provided for the video stated the model's name as Tonya, a woman who had never done this type of work before. There are two versions of the video; edited and unedited. In the unedited version the woman's breast and pelvic areas are clearly visible. These areas of the body are darkened and blurred for the television version and the scenes are sped up. Various camera and computer effects are used throughout the video. The video saw significant airplay upon release and is included on the aMOTION DVD/CD. The end of the video features a barely audible shampoo commercial.

Track listing
US single

Canadian and European single

7" single

Chart performance

References

External links
Music video

2003 singles
A Perfect Circle songs
Songs written by Maynard James Keenan
Songs written by Billy Howerdel
2003 songs
Virgin Records singles